Eastern Region is a region in eastern Iceland. The Eastern Regions has a jagged coastline of fjords, referred to as the Eastfjords.

The largest town in the region is Egilsstaðir, with a population of 2,300. The oldest municipality is Djúpivogur, which got their trading licence in 1589 and had a population of 470 in 2015.

The only car and passenger ferry that sails between Iceland and the European continent calls at Seyðisfjörður once a week in the summer months and intermittently the rest of the year.

The region is home to the Kárahnjúkar Hydropower Plant. Among notable tourist destinations are the  Helgustaðir mine, which is known for its Iceland spar, and Stuðlagil.

See also 

 List of populated places in Eastern Region (Iceland)

External links